Arthur Frost may refer to:
 Arthur Frost (footballer) (1915–1998), British football player
  (1909–2002), American chemist, inventor of Frost diagrams 
 A. B. Frost (Arthur Burdett Frost, 1851–1928), American artist
 Arthur George Frost, Canadian politician, member of the 24th and 25th Legislative Assembly of Ontario